Manoj Chandila is an Indian actor and model. He is known for the role of Dr. Manoj Paul on Star Plus TV show Ye Hai Mohabbatein.

Career

He has done many roles in various Hindi television shows like Kis Desh Mein Hai Meraa Dil, Matti Ki Banno, Mrs. Kaushik Ki Paanch Bahuein and Aahat (season 6).

Filmography

Television

Film

References

External links

21st-century Indian male actors
Living people
Indian male television actors
Indian male film actors
Male actors in Hindi television
Male actors in Hindi cinema
Punjabi people
Indian male models
Male actors from Delhi
Year of birth missing (living people)